This is a list of members of the Tasmanian Legislative Council from 2006 to 2010. Terms of the Legislative Council do not coincide with Legislative Assembly elections, with members serving six-year terms, and two or three members facing re-election every year. The members have been categorised here according to the four-year terms of the Legislative Assembly so as to avoid the need for separate member lists for each year.

1 Rowallan MLC Greg Hall and Wellington MLC Doug Parkinson faced re-election at the 2006 periodic elections. Both were returned.
2 Elwick MLC Terry Martin was elected as an ALP member, but was expelled from the parliamentary Labor party on 29 March 2007, after voting against government legislation to fast-track planning approval for the proposed Bell Bay Pulp Mill. He has stated his intention to serve out the remainder of his term as an independent.
3 Montgomery MLC Sue Smith, Nelson MLC Jim Wilkinson and Pembroke MLC Allison Ritchie faced re-election at the 2007 periodic elections. All three were returned.
4 Huon MLC Paul Harriss and Rosevears MLC Kerry Finch faced re-election at the 2008 periodic elections. Both were returned.
5 Derwent MLC Michael Aird and Windermere MLC Ivan Dean faced re-election at the 2009 periodic elections. Both were returned. Mersey MLC Norma Jamieson retired, and the election for her seat was won by Mike Gaffney.
6 Pembroke MLC Allison Ritchie resigned on 20 June 2009. The ensuing by-election was won by Vanessa Goodwin.

Members of Tasmanian parliaments by term
21st-century Australian politicians